The Biltmore Beacon is a weekly newspaper by the Mountaineer Publishing Company. It reports the news and events of Asheville, North Carolina and is specifically written to be of interest to residents and businesses in the various Biltmore communities including Biltmore Forest, Biltmore Park, Biltmore Lake, The Ramble at Biltmore Forest, Main Street at Biltmore Park and Biltmore Village.

See also
 List of newspapers published in North Carolina

References

Weekly newspapers published in North Carolina
Asheville, North Carolina